Alik Sukh (English: Unreal Happiness) is a 2013 Bengali Medical psychological thriller  based on the novel Alikh Sukh by Suchitra Bhattacharya. The film is directed by the duo Shiboprosad Mukherjee and Nandita Roy, starring Debshankar Haldar, Rituparna Sengupta and Sohini Sengupta in the lead roles. It released on 19 July 2013. The storyline is based on a novel of Bengali novelist Suchitra Bhattacharya.

Plot 
A renowned gynecologist, Dr Kingshuk Guha (Debshankar Haldar), lands himself in a professional crisis when one of his patients, Kabita Mondol (Sohini Sengupta), dies on the operating table while he is away buying a luxury apartment for his family. Kabita's enraged husband (Biswanath Basu) and relatives attempt to mob the hospital. On hearing the news, Kingshuk's wife, Rumi (Rituparna Sengupta), rushes to the hospital to be with her husband. She happens to see Kabita's corpse lying unattended in the empty operation theatre and begins to imagine that the dead woman is communicating with her.
Well-off, in a loving marriage, and pregnant with the couple's second child, Rumi begins to question her right to happiness when her husband has been responsible for depriving another family of its loved one. She becomes emotionally alienated from Kingshuk when he refuses to accept culpability for Kabita's death. Kingshuk, in turn, grows frustrated at Rumi's lack of support as he faces investigation by a medical committee and a compensation claim of Rs 1,000,000 by Kabita's relatives. Kingshuk and Rumi's relationship sours to the point that they stop speaking to each other.
Eventually, Rumi leaves with her son to stay for a while at her parents’ house. Kingshuk manages to reach an out-of-court settlement for Rs 3,00,000 with Kabita's relatives. Relieved and wishing to reconcile, he calls Rumi, announcing that he has "bought the patient party". Rumi is devastated at Kingshuk's callous attitude and the lack of justice for Kabita. Soon after receiving the call, she suffers a fall and has a miscarriage, which leads to severe abdominal hemorrhaging. The tables are turned and Kingshuk finds himself in the same position as Kabita's crazed husband as the medical team at the local hospital takes its time in attending to Rumi.
Rumi survives. A penitent Kingshuk seeks forgiveness for his actions and promises to make things better between them. From Rumi's perspective, Kabita finally experiences closure. Hopes for a happier future emerge.

Cast 
 Debshankar Haldar as Kingshuk Guha
 Rituparna Sengupta as Rammani
 Sohini Sengupta as Kabita
 Biswanath Basu as Biswajit
 Saayoni Ghosh as Namita
 Kharaj Mukherjee

Crew
 Directed by Nandita Roy & Shiboprosad Mukherjee
 Produced by Windows
 Screenplay & Dialogues by Nandita Roy & Shiboprosad Mukherjee
 Director of Photography Sirsha Ray
 Edited by Malay Laha
 Music by Nachiketa Chakraborty & Anindya Chatterjee
 Background score by Joy Sarkar
 Production Designer Amit Chatterjee
 Sound by Anirban Sengupta & Dipankar Chaki
 Costume by Dibyakanti Sen
 Publicity design by Saumik & Piyali

Direction
Nandita Roy is an Indian filmmaker, screenplay writer and producer. She has been working in the film industry for the past 30 years. She has worked in many television serials and National Award-winning films. Shiboprosad Mukherjee is an Indian filmmaker, actor and producer. He started his acting career by joining the Theatre in Education Project and was a regular theatre artiste at Nandikar. He learnt his art from celebrated thespians like Rudraprasad Sengupta and Ibrahim Alkazi. 
The director duo ventured into cinema in 2011, with their first film, Icche. From then on, they have co-directed films like Accident (2012), Muktodhara (2012), Alik Sukh (2013), Ramdhanu (2014), Belaseshe (2015), Praktan (2016) Posto (2017), Haami (2018), Konttho (2019), Gotro (2019), which have been critically acclaimed and commercially successful. Their films have been appreciated for their socially relevant content and entertaining narrative structure.

Influences 
In an interview to The Times of India, director Shiboprosad Mukherjee said that although the film is based on a novel, it was influenced by his father's death on 15 April 1994. Regarding his personal experience regarding the lives of doctors, he said,

Soundtrack 
Soundtrack of Alik Sukh has been composed by Anindya Chatterjee and Nachiketa Chakraborty.

Response 
Alik Sukh has heavily stirred the conscience of all the individuals, irrespective of the profession they belong to. It has been critically acclaimed and has also contributed a big deal in raising the standard  of the tollywood film industry. It ran in theatres successfully for 50 days. Later, on 15 September 2013, it made an all-India release.

Accolades
Alik Sukh was premiered at the Marché du Film section in Cannes Film Festival in 2013. Nandita Roy and Shiboprosad Mukherjee received the Filmfare Awards East for Best Direction for the film Alik Sukh this year. In the same Awards ceremony, Rituparna Sengupta received the award for Best Actor and Anindya Chatterjee for Best Lyrics for Alik Sukh.

See also
 Ramdhanu
 Muktodhara
 Icche
 Accident
 The Verdict

References

External links
 

Bengali-language Indian films
2010s Bengali-language films
Films directed by Nandita Roy and Shiboprosad Mukherjee
Films based on works by Suchitra Bhattacharya